Hassan Chande Kigwalilo is a former Member of Parliament in the National Assembly of Tanzania.

References

Living people
Members of the National Assembly (Tanzania)
Year of birth missing (living people)
Place of birth missing (living people)
21st-century Tanzanian politicians